Hanemann is a surname. Notable people with the surname include:

Felix Hanemann (born 1953), American singer and musician
W. Michael Hanemann (born 1944), American economist